EV3 may refer to:

 EV3, a 1997 album by American female vocal group En Vogue
 EV3 The Pilgrims Route, a long-distance cycling route in Europe
 Lego Mindstorms EV3